Nassarius olivaceus, common name: the olivaceous nassa, is a species of sea snail, a marine gastropod mollusc in the family Nassariidae, the nassa mud snails or dog whelks.

Description
The shell size varies between 25 mm and 50 mm

The ovate, conical shell is of a reddish or olive color. It is composed of eight or nine whorls, the lowest of which composes nearly half of the shell. It is smooth, slightly arcuated, and often ornamented upon each whorl with a whitish band. When young, it is marked with convex, longitudinal folds, which are intersected at the base of the body whorl only, by five or six pretty deep transverse striae. Upon the upper whorls the folds are much more close, and also more prominent, than upon the lowest, where they often disappear altogether. The edge of the aperture is whitish, ovate, notched at both ends, the cavity of an ash color. The notch above is small, placed upon the upper edge of the outer lip, where it is contracted to the form of a small canal. The emargination of the base is arched. The outer lip is thick, margined exteriorly, crenulated indistinctly upon the lower edge, and marked within with very distinct, transverse striae. The left lip is continued in front, in a thin leaf which extends a little over the columella. It is smooth interiorly, and edged throughout its whole length with a row of small drops.

Distribution
This species occurs in the Central and East Indian Ocean off Madagascar, Mozambique, South Africa, Mauritius and Tanzania; off East India, Andaman Islands, Indo-Malaysia, Thailand, the Philippines, Indonesia, New Caledonia, Papua New Guinea, Solomon Islands and Australia (Northern Territory, Queensland)

Parasites 
 Stephanostomum-like cercariae from Australia: Cercaria capricornia VII

References

 Bruguière, J.G. 1789. Buccinum. Encyclopédie Méthodique ou par de matieres. Historie Naturelle des Vers et Mollusques 1: 236–285 
 Gmelin J.F. 1791. Caroli a Linné. Systema Naturae per regna tria naturae, secundum classes, ordines, genera, species, cum characteribus, differentiis, synonymis, locis. Lipsiae : Georg. Emanuel. Beer Vermes. Vol. 1(Part 6) pp. 3021–3910
 Adams, A. 1852. Catalogue of the species of Nassa, a genus of Gasteropodous Mollusca, belonging to the family Buccinidae, in the Collection of Hugh Cuming, Esq., with the description of some new species. Proceedings of the Zoological Society of London 1851(19): 94–112
 Rousseau, L. 1854. Voyage au Pôle Sud et dans l'Océanie sur les corvettes l'Astrolabe et la Zélée , exécuté ... pendant ... 1837–1840, sous le commandemant de M.J. Dumont d'Urville ... publié ... sous la direction supérieure de M. Jacquinot, etc. 5: Zoologie. Description des mollusques, coquilles et zoophytes. Paris : Publisher unknown 132 pp. 
 Pease, W.H. 1868. Description of sixty-five new species of marine gastropodae, inhabiting Polynesia. American Journal of Conchology 3(4): 271–297 
 Cossmann, M. 1903. Faune Pliocénique de Karikal (Inde Française). Journal de Conchyliologie 51: 105–173, pls 3–6
 Dautzenberg, Ph. (1929). Mollusques testacés marins de Madagascar. Faune des Colonies Francaises, Tome III
 Spry, J.F. (1961). The sea shells of Dar es Salaam: Gastropods. Tanganyika Notes and Records 56 
 Cernohorsky W. O. (1984). Systematics of the family Nassariidae (Mollusca: Gastropoda). Bulletin of the Auckland Institute and Museum 14: 1–356.
 Drivas, J. & M. Jay (1988). Coquillages de La Réunion et de l'île Maurice
 Wilson, B. 1994. Australian Marine Shells. Prosobranch Gastropods. Kallaroo, WA : Odyssey Publishing Vol. 2 370 pp. 
 Richmond, M. (Ed.) (1997). A guide to the seashores of Eastern Africa and the Western Indian Ocean islands. Sida/Department for Research Cooperation, SAREC: Stockholm, Sweden. . 448 pp.

External links
 

Nassariidae
Gastropods described in 1791